Sarıağıl can refer to:

 Sarıağıl, Ağaçören
 Sarıağıl, Beypazarı
 Sarıağıl, İznik